Carter–Swain House is a historic home located near Democrat, Buncombe County, North Carolina. The original section was built about 1849, and is a two-story, log house measuring 15 feet by 17 feet.  It was later expanded, and is a two-story weatherboarded structure with two-tiered porches and a rear ell.  Also on the property is a contributing four-pen log barn.  The house functioned as a roadside inn during the late-19th century.

It was listed on the National Register of Historic Places in 1987.

References

Log houses in the United States
Houses on the National Register of Historic Places in North Carolina
Houses completed in 1849
Houses in Buncombe County, North Carolina
National Register of Historic Places in Buncombe County, North Carolina
1849 establishments in North Carolina
Log buildings and structures on the National Register of Historic Places in North Carolina